Loads of Love is a 1963 jazz studio album by Shirley Horn, arranged by Jimmy Jones. Prestigious musicians collaborated on the album, including Gerry Mulligan, Kenny Burrell, Al Cohn, and Hank Jones.

Reception

The Allmusic review by Scott Yanow awarded the album three stars and said: "...Horn does not play piano at all, sticking exclusively to vocals, and she had less control over the interpretations (being persuaded to sing some songs at faster-than-usual tempos) than she would later on...although the overall music is enjoyable, Horn would have much preferred to be the pianist behind her own vocals."

Track listing
 "Wild Is Love" (Raymond Rasch, Dorothy Wayne) – 1:48
 "Loads of Love" (Richard Rodgers) – 2:27
 "My Future Just Passed" (George Marion, Jr., Richard Whiting) – 2:44
 "There's a Boat Dat's Leavin' Soon for New York" (George Gershwin, Ira Gershwin, DuBose Heyward) – 2:45
 "Ten Cents a Dance" (Lorenz Hart, Rodgers) – 4:27
 "Only the Lonely" (Sammy Cahn, Jimmy Van Heusen) – 3:09
 "The Second Time Around" (Cahn, Van Heusen) – 3:15
 "Do It Again" (Buddy DeSylva, George Gershwin) – 2:57
 "It's Love" (Leonard Bernstein, Betty Comden, Adolph Green) – 2:05
 "That's No Joke" (Joe Bailey) – 2:41
 "Love for Sale" (Cole Porter) – 3:52
 "Who Am I?" (Jule Styne, George Brown, Walter Bullock) – 2:50

Personnel
Shirley Horn – vocals
Jerome Richardson – flute, woodwind
Frank Wess – flute, tenor saxophone
Al Cohn – tenor saxophone
Gerry Mulligan – baritone saxophone
Joe Newman – trumpet
Ernie Royal
Kenny Burrell – guitar
Hank Jones – piano
Jimmy Jones – piano, arranger, conductor
Milt Hinton – double bass
Osie Johnson – drums
Gene Orloff – violin

References

1963 albums
Shirley Horn albums
Albums arranged by Jimmy Jones (pianist)
Mercury Records albums